Cardenas (pronounced  ) is a supermarket chain based in Ontario, California, United States, that specializes in Latin American cuisine. , the company operates 49 Cardenas stores and seven Los Altos Ranch Markets stores in California, Arizona, and Nevada.

History
Cardenas began in 1981 when Jesús Cárdenas, a farmworker from Jalisco, and his wife Luz opened their first grocery store in Ontario. In 2016, Kohlberg Kravis Roberts purchased Cardenas along with San Jose–based Mi Pueblo Food Center. The two chains merged in July 2017, and Mi Pueblo stores were converted to Cardenas stores the following year. In June 2022, it was announced that KKR would sell Cardenas to funds affiliated with Apollo Global Management for an undisclosed amount. Following the close of the deal, the Apollo Funds will combine Cardenas and Tony's Fresh Market, although both will continue to operate under their existing brands.

References

External links
 

Ontario, California
Companies based in San Bernardino County, California
Retail companies established in 1981
1981 establishments in California
Supermarkets based in California